The Hospital Caterers Association  is an industry body in the United Kingdom for people and organisations involved in NHS Healthcare Catering Management established in 1948

It runs an annual award ceremony.

It set up an annual Nutrition and Hydration Week, every March. In 2016 95% of NHS Trusts and more than 2,000 care homes participated.

It supports efforts to reduce unhealthy food and drink supplies in the NHS.

Andy Jones, a former Chair of the Association, challenged NHS Chief Executives to eat patients food for a week in 2016, so that they would have a better understanding of the challenges.

Its Outstanding Service Award in 2020 went to Phil Shelley, who went on to be Chair of the NHS Review of Hospital Food.

Presidents
 1949 -1952 Sir Jack Drummond
 1952 – 1966 Sir Alexander H. Maxwell
 1966 – 1972 Sir Geoffrey Todd
 1972 – 1977 R. A. Micklewright
 1977 – 1987 Sir Douglas Haddow
 1987 - 2004  Sir Brian Bailey OBE
 2004 - 2005 Lord Hunt of Kings Heath
 2006 - 2008 Caroline Waldegrave.
 2009 - 2011 Rennie Fritchie, Baroness Fritchie
 2012 - 2017  Fionnuala Cook
 2017 - Lord Hunt of Kings Heath.

References 

Food industry trade groups based in the United Kingdom
Health care industry trade groups based in the United Kingdom
Organizations established in 1948
Catering